Ayan Faikov Sadakov (26 September 1961 – 1 July 2017) was a Bulgarian footballer and a key member of the Bulgarian national team in the 1986 FIFA World Cup.

Club career
Sadakov began his club career at the local Lokomotiv Plovdiv. For "The Smurfs" he played eleven seasons, before transferring to Portugal's C.F. Os Belenenses in 1989. Two years later he return in Lokomotiv and played two years, before signed with Botev Plovdiv in summer 1994.

International
Sadakov made 80 appearances for Bulgaria, between 1981 and 1991 and scored 9 goals. He played in four matches for his country at 1986 FIFA World Cup.

Coaching career
Sadakov had been appointed on September 29, 2008 as a manager of Lokomotiv Plovdiv a second time to replace Dragan Kanatlarovski.

Personal life
In 2014, Sadakov announced he was diagnosed with ALS. He died on 1 July 2017, aged 55.

Honours
Lokomotiv Plovdiv
Cup of the Soviet Army (1): 1983

References

External links

1961 births
2017 deaths
Bulgarian football managers
Bulgarian footballers
Bulgarian expatriate footballers
Bulgaria international footballers
1986 FIFA World Cup players
First Professional Football League (Bulgaria) players
Bulgarian expatriate sportspeople in Portugal
Primeira Liga players
Footballers from Plovdiv
Botev Plovdiv players
PFC Lokomotiv Plovdiv players
PFC Lokomotiv Plovdiv managers
C.F. Os Belenenses players
Neurological disease deaths in Bulgaria
Deaths from motor neuron disease
Association football midfielders